Joshua Mauger (1725– 18 October 1788) was a prominent merchant and slave trader in Halifax, Nova Scotia (1749–60) and then went to England and became Nova Scotia's colonial agent (1762).  He has been referred to as "the first great merchant and shipowner" in Halifax.  He was a member of St. Matthew's United Church (Halifax).  Along with prominent merchant Captain Ephraim Cook (mariner), Mauger pushed Governor Lawrence for an elected assembly (1757).

He was born in Jersey the son of José Mauger and Sarah Le Couteur and went to sea with his uncle Matthew Mauger. He eventually became master of his own ship and settled in Halifax as an agent victualler to the British navy and a merchant.

He later returned to England and became a Member of Parliament for Poole from 1768 to 1780.

He died in 1788, having married his Uncle Matthew's daughter, with whom he had a daughter.

Legacy 
Maugerville, New Brunswick (q.v.) is named for him. He is the namesake of Mauger Beach (later known as "Hangman's Beach") on McNabs Island.

See also 
 List of MPs elected in the British general election, 1768

References 

1725 births
1788 deaths
Jersey people
Members of the Parliament of Great Britain for English constituencies
British MPs 1768–1774
British MPs 1774–1780
History of Nova Scotia
British slave traders